Izumo (出雲) may refer to:

Locations
 Izumo Province, an old province of Japan
 Izumo, Shimane, a city located in Shimane Prefecture
 Izumo Airport
 Izumo-taisha,  one of Japan's most ancient and important Shinto shrines

Ships
 Izumo-class multi-purpose destroyer, a class of multi-purpose operation destroyer operated by the Japan Maritime Self-Defense Force
 JS Izumo, lead ship of this class
 Japanese cruiser Izumo, an armored cruiser operated by the Imperial Japanese Navy

Fiction
 SDF-4 Izumo, a spaceship in the Robotech universe
 Izumo: Takeki Tsurugi no Senki, an anime series
 Kunisaki Izumo no Jijō, a Japanese manga series
 Izumo Kamurogi, the commander of Altair forces in the anime series Aquarion Evol
 Daisuke Izumo, the main character in the anime series Ninja Captor who portrayed by Daisuke Ban

Other
 Izumo (train), a former train service in Japan
 Sunrise Izumo, a train service in Japan
 IZUMO1, a sperm-specific protein necessary for sperm-egg plasma membrane binding and fusion.